Seán Bleahene (born 1999) is an Irish hurler who plays for Galway Senior Championship club Ahascragh-Fohenagh and at inter-county level with the Galway senior hurling team. He usually lines out as a right corner-forward.

Honours

Galway
Leinster Under-21 Hurling Championship (1): 2018
All-Ireland Minor Hurling Championship (1): 2017

Career statistics

References

1999 births
Living people
Ahascragh-Fohenagh hurlers
Galway inter-county hurlers